Eli Sollied Øveraas (born 15 August 1949 in Ørskog) is a Norwegian politician for the Centre Party (SP). She was elected to the Norwegian Parliament from Møre og Romsdal in 1993. Failing to get re-elected in 1997, she still served as a deputy representative and was elected again in 2001.

She previously worked with local politics in Vestnes.

Parliamentary Committee duties 
2005 - 2009 member of the Standing Committee on Transport and Communications.
2001 - 2005 member of the Standing Committee on Family and Cultural Affairs.
1993 - 1997 secretary of the Standing Committee on Family and Cultural Affairs.
1993 - 1997 deputy member of the Electoral Committee.

External links

1949 births
Living people
People from Vestnes
Møre og Romsdal politicians
Members of the Storting
Women members of the Storting
Centre Party (Norway) politicians
21st-century Norwegian politicians
21st-century Norwegian women politicians
20th-century Norwegian politicians
20th-century Norwegian women politicians